Vardin (also Romanized as Vardīn; also known as Gharakh Bolagh, Kirkh Plakh, Kyrkh-Plakh, and Qerkh Bolāgh) is a village in Goyjah Bel Rural District, in the Central District of Ahar County, East Azerbaijan Province, Iran. At the 2006 census, its population was 56, in 16 families.

References 

Populated places in Ahar County